Goes fisheri is a species of beetle in the family Cerambycidae. It was described by Dillon and Dillon in 1941. It is known from the United States.

References

Lamiini
Beetles described in 1941